Patrick Parsons (born 22 May 1934) is an Australian wrestler. He competed in the men's freestyle light heavyweight at the 1960 Summer Olympics.

References

1934 births
Living people
Australian male sport wrestlers
Olympic wrestlers of Australia
Wrestlers at the 1960 Summer Olympics